<< List of Vanity Fair caricatures (1875–1879) >> List of Vanity Fair caricatures (1885–1889)

The following is from a list of caricatures  published 1880–1884 by the British magazine Vanity Fair (1868–1914).

 
1880s in the United Kingdom